Trail to Mexico is a 1946 American Western film written and directed by Oliver Drake. The film stars Jimmy Wakely, Lee "Lasses" White, Julian Rivero, Dolores Castelli, Dora Del Rio and Terry Frost. The film was released on June 29, 1946, by Monogram Pictures.

Plot

Cast          
Jimmy Wakely as Jimmy Wakely / Jimmy Jones
Lee "Lasses" White as Lasses White
Julian Rivero as Don Roberto Lopez
Dolores Castelli as Chinita Lopez
Dora Del Rio as Dolores
Terry Frost as Bart Thomas
Forrest Matthews as Fred Jackson
Buster Slaven as The Texas Kid 
Alex Montoya as Captain Martinez
Jonathan McCall as Paymaster McGrath
Juan Duval as Francisco Valdez
Arthur 'Fiddlin' Smith as Saddle Pals Fiddle Player

References

External links
 

1946 films
American Western (genre) films
1946 Western (genre) films
Monogram Pictures films
Films directed by Oliver Drake
American black-and-white films
1940s English-language films
1940s American films